Real Hope Football Academy is a professional football club based in Cap-Haïtien, Haiti.

History
Real Hope Football Academy was formed by former Vice President from AS Capoise (located in Cap-Haïtien), who decided to create a football club and founded Real Hope Football Academy on May 14, 2014.

Real started in Division 3 and was quickly promoted to Division 2 the following year in 2015. After being crowned champions of the 2015 season, the club was promoted to the top-tier Division 1, in just its second year of existence.

References

Football clubs in Haiti
Association football clubs established in 2014
2014 establishments in Haiti
Nord (Haitian department)
Cap-Haïtien